The Hillcrest Mystery is a 1918 silent film directed by George Fitzmaurice and starring Irene Castle. It was distributed by Pathé Exchange in March 1918.

Cast
Irene Castle - Marion Sterling
J. H. Gilmour - Thomas Sterling
Ralph Kellard - Gordon Brett
Wyndham Standing - Hugo Smith
DeWitt Jennings - Tom Cameron

Preservation status
The film is lost.

References

External links

1918 films
American silent feature films
Films directed by George Fitzmaurice
Lost American films
American mystery films
Films with screenplays by Ouida Bergère
American black-and-white films
1918 mystery films
Pathé Exchange films
1918 lost films
Lost mystery films
1910s American films
Silent mystery films
1910s English-language films